Lewes is an incorporated city on the Delaware Bay in eastern Sussex County, Delaware, United States. According to the 2010 census, the population is 2,747. Along with neighboring Rehoboth Beach, Lewes is one of the principal cities of Delaware's rapidly growing Cape Region. The city lies within the Salisbury, Maryland–Delaware Metropolitan Statistical Area.  Lewes proudly claims to be "The First Town in The First State."

History
Lewes was the site of the first European settlement in Delaware, a whaling and trading post that Dutch settlers founded on June 3, 1631, and named Zwaanendael (Swan Valley). The colony had a short existence, as a local tribe of Lenape Indians murdered all the 32 settlers in 1632.

The area remained rather neglected by the Dutch until, under the threat of annexation from the colony of Maryland, the city of Amsterdam made a grant of land at the Hoernkills (the area around Cape Henlopen, near the current town of Lewes) to a group of Mennonites for settlement in 1662. A total of 35 men were to be included in the settlement, led by a Pieter Cornelisz Plockhoy of Zierikzee and funded by a sizable loan from the city to get them established. 41 persons came with Plockhoy from the Netherlands to the Hoernkill onboard the Dutch ship the Sint Jacob, one of whom was Otto Wolgast from the town of Wolgast, Pomerania. The settlement was established in 1663, and lasted until the very next year; in 1664, the English captured New Netherland from the Dutch, and they ordered the settlement razed with reports indicating that “not even a nail” was left there.

The Dutch colonists proved slow to regroup, but a new settlement gradually regrew around the Hoernkills.  In late December 1673, when the area was briefly held again by the Dutch, the settlement was attacked and burned down again by a group of Maryland colonists. In 1680, under the authority of the Duke of York, who had been granted such authority by his brother, King Charles II, the village (and county) was reorganized and known for two years as New Deale, Deale County, Delaware. A log courthouse was authorized to be built at this time. An Anglican congregation was established by 1681 and a Presbyterian church was built in 1682.

In 1682, the Delaware colonies were given to William Penn by King Charles II as payment for a family debt. When Penn arrived in the New World later that year, he renamed the county as Sussex and the Hoernkills settlement as Lewes, in commemoration of sites in England. Lewes became and remained the county seat of Sussex County until 1791, when it was moved to a more west-central county location, the current town of Georgetown. The town was also known as "Lewistown" or "Lewestown".

On April 6 and 7, 1813, during the War of 1812, Royal Navy vessels led by HMS Poictiers under the command of Captain Sir John Beresford briefly and ineffectually bombarded the town. A cannonball from the bombardment is lodged in the foundation of Cannonball House, which now serves as the town's maritime museum.

Lewes was incorporated by an act of the state assembly on Feb. 2, 1818. The act provided for five persons to be chosen as commissioners to be known as "Trustees of the Town of Lewes."

Lewes Beach itself was an important stop on the Underground Railroad in the years leading up to the American Civil War.  As a "border state," Delaware was not part of the Confederacy, but was still quite dangerous for fugitive slaves.  Several houses in Lewes thus housed escaping slaves; these "safe houses" were identified by the residents placing a single candle in the top window of the house.

In 1941, the United States built Fort Miles on Cape Henlopen, immediately south of Lewes, to defend Delaware Bay and the Delaware River and the oil refineries and factories on its shores, as well as the city of Philadelphia.

Fort Miles never saw any major action; except for range practice, it fired its guns only once between its establishment and the end of World War II. Fort Miles ceased operation altogether in 1991 and was deeded to the State of Delaware.

In addition to Fort Miles, the Cape Henlopen Archeological District, Coleman House, Cool Spring Presbyterian Church, De Vries Palisade, Delaware Breakwater and Lewes Harbor, Fisher Homestead, Fisher's Paradise, Col. David Hall House, Hopkins Covered Bridge Farm, Lewes Historic District, Lewes Presbyterian Church, Lightship WAL 539, Maull House, National Harbor of Refuge and Delaware Breakwater Harbor Historic District, Pagan Creek Dike, Roosevelt Inlet Shipwreck, William Russell House, St. George's Chapel, Lewes, Townsend Site, and Wolfe's Neck Site are listed on the National Register of Historic Places.

Mayoral history  
Andrew Williams 2022–Present
Theodore W. Becker 2014–2022
James Ford III 2004–2014
George H.P. Smith 1994–2004
Dr. John Adams 1992–1994
Al Stango 1968–1992 
Otis H. Smith 1950–1968
H. Edward Maull 1944–1950
Thomas H. Carpenter 1940–1944
William E. Walsh 1938–1940
David W. Burbage 1936–1938
Dr. Ulysses W. Hocker 1931–1936
Dr. James T. Thompson 1927–1930 (died in office, May 20, 1930)
Willard H. Collins 1926–1927
Dr. James T. Thompson 1914–1926
Thomas B. Schellenger 1913–1914
Dr. James T. Thompson 1900–1913
Alfred L. Burton 1898–1900

Home to governors
Six men who served as Delaware governor were born in or made their home in Lewes. Three of those men lived on Lewes' Second Street. Brothers Daniel and Caleb Rodney, sons of John Rodney, first cousin of Caesar Rodney, each served as governor of Delaware. Each a member of the Federalist Party, Daniel served from 1814 to 1817, while Caleb served as acting governor from 1822 to 1823. Ebe Walters Tunnell moved to Lewes in 1873 to enter the drug and hardware business in part of the old Caleb Rodney House on Second Street. Tunnell worked his way up the state government hierarchy before unsuccessfully running for governor in 1892. Four years later, the Democrat won the election, and served from 1897 to 1901.

City motto and name
As Lewes was the earliest settlement in the state, and Delaware was the first state to ratify the Constitution, the town refers to itself as "The First Town in the First State." Lewes is named after the town of Lewes in England, which is situated in a county named Sussex (from which Sussex County, Delaware, takes its name). Lewes, Sussex, England, also has the same seal.

Geography
Lewes is located at  (38.7745565, –75.1393498).

Climate

Situated on the Atlantic Coastal Plain, Lewes's weather is moderated by the Atlantic Ocean and the Delaware Bay.  Lewes has a mild humid subtropical climate (Cfa) consisting of hot, humid summers and mild winters.  The average daytime high in July is 87 °F (30.6 °C) and a low of 70 °F (21 °C); in January, the average high is 45 °F (7 °C) with an average low of 30 °F (-1 °C)  The month of highest average rainfall is July with 4.78 inches of rain, while February is historically the driest month, receiving an average of only 3.23 inches (80.5 mm) of rain.

The highest official temperature ever recorded in Lewes was 102 °F (38.8 °C) in 1997.  The lowest official temperature ever recorded in Lewes was -11 °F (-28.8 °C) in 1982.

Demographics

As of the census of 2000, there were 2,932 people, 1,338 households, and 797 families residing in the city. The racial makeup of the city was 87.3% White, 9.9% African American, 0.1% Native American, 1.0% Asian, <0.1% Pacific Islander, 0.7% from other races, and 0.9% from two or more races. Hispanic or Latino of any race were 1.7% of the population.

There were 1,338 households, out of which 15.1% had children under the age of 18 living with them, 49.3% were married couples living together, 8.4% had a female householder with no husband present, and 40.4% were non-families. 35.1% of all households were made up of individuals, and 14.4% had someone living alone who was 65 years of age or older. The average household size was 1.99 and the average family size was 2.53.

In the city, the population was spread out, with 13.6% under the age of 18, 3.7% from 18 to 24, 18.0% from 25 to 44, 31.5% from 45 to 64, and 33.1% who were 65 years of age or older. The median age was 55 years. For every 100 females, there were 78.2 males. For every 100 females age 18 and over, there were 76.1 males.

The median income for a household in the city was $66,387, and the median income for a family was $72,605. Males had a median income of $39,500 versus $35,227 for females. The per capita income for the city was $36,685. About 3.1% of families and 6.0% of the population were below the poverty line, including 11.3% of those under age 18 and 5.4% of those age 65 or over.

Education

Lewes is served by the Cape Henlopen School District. The Lewes School District was consolidated into the Cape Henlopen district in 1969. Lewes is zoned to:
Richard Shields Elementary School
Cape Henlopen High School (in an unincorporated area with a Lewes address), the sole comprehensive high school of the district

Sussex Consortium, a school for students with autism previously in the former Lewes School, is now in an unincorporated area with a Lewes address.

The University of Delaware's Hugh R. Sharp Campus is also within the city. This is home to the University's College of Earth, Ocean, and Environment.

Lewes students are also eligible to enter Sussex Academy of Arts and Sciences, which is not in the city but is in the nearby city of Georgetown.

The Lewes School first opened as a multi-grade school in 1921 and became Lewes High School by 1946. It initially held Cape Henlopen High School when it opened in 1969. Lewes School will be repurposed as the new Richard A. Shields Elementary.

Arts and culture

Museums and other points of interest

Lewes serves as a vacation and resort spot popular with residents of Washington, D.C., and the surrounding suburbs. Even though the city limits primarily sit on the lower reach of the Delaware Bay, it is nonetheless considered an ocean resort, particularly as the ocean is nearby at Cape Henlopen. Lewes is among those communities which have banned smoking in its public parks.

Lewes is the home of the Zwaanendael Museum, which features exhibits about Delaware's history. Savannah, Second and Front Streets are the town's main streets and have many shops, restaurants, parks and historical venues. Fisherman's Wharf is a dock that stretches along the Lewes and Rehoboth Canal. It features multiple restaurants and bait shops, and in season the dock hosts hundreds of boats from all over.

The Lewes Historical Society promotes the preservation, interpretation and cultural enrichment of the Lewes region through museum exhibits, educational programs, historical research and publications.

Lewes in Bloom is an organization that promotes and maintains the beauty of Historic Lewes. Lewes in Bloom won America in Bloom's contest in 2003, 2005, 2010 and 2015 for cities with population under 5,000. In 2012 and 2015 Lewes in Bloom was honored in the AIB “Circle of Champions”.

Lighthouses

United States Lightship Overfalls (LV-118/WAL-539), one of nine surviving lightships at museums in the United States, is moored in Lewes along the Lewes and Rehoboth Canal

Lewes is home to several iconic Lighthouses in the Delaware Bay. Just offshore lies the National Harbor of Refuge which is home to the Delaware Breakwater East End Light and the Harbor of Refuge Light.

Parks and recreation

Lewes is adjacent to Cape Henlopen State Park.
Lewes also maintains several parks within the city limits:
Blockhouse Pond Park
Stango Park
Zwaanendael Park & Herb Garden
1812 Memorial Park (Cannonball Park)
Mary Vessels Park
George H.P. Smith Park
Canalfront Park & Marina
Lewes Beach
Great Marsh Park

DNREC maintains a boat ramp just outside the city limits along the Broadkill River, adjacent to the Roosevelt Inlet.

Infrastructure

Law Enforcement and Emergency Services
Lewes is primarily policed by the Lewes Police Department and Delaware State Police. For EMS Lewes is serviced by the Lewes Volunteer Fire Department. The town also see the occasional Delaware Natural Resource Police officer patrolling the waterways, and the state park. Lewes also has a United States Coast Guard Marine safety detachment

Transportation

Delaware Route 1 (DE 1) passes just outside city limits at Five Points where DE 1, U.S. Route 9 (US 9), DE 404, DE 23 and DE 1D (Plantation Road) intersect. There are three main arterial roads that connect Lewes to DE 1:  New Road, Savannah Road (US 9 Business) and  King's Highway (US 9). US 9 passes to the southeast of downtown on the Theodore C. Freeman Memorial Highway. Parking meters are in effect for on-street parking and parking lots in the downtown area between May 1 and October 14 and at parking lots at Lewes Beach between May 1 and September 30.

The southern terminus of the Cape May–Lewes Ferry is located in Lewes. The ferry provides passenger and automobile ferry service between southern Delaware and southern New Jersey, crossing the Delaware Bay to North Cape May, New Jersey, and serves as part of US 9. Cape Water Tours & Taxi operates a round-trip water taxi service between Lewes and Dewey Beach via the Lewes and Rehoboth Canal on Friday evenings in the summer months, offering access to dining and nightlife in Dewey Beach.

DART First State operates the Lewes Transit Center park and ride just outside Lewes along DE 1. The transit center serves local bus routes providing service across Sussex County, with expanded Beach Bus service to the Delaware Beaches in the summer months, and inter-county bus service to other part of Delaware. This park and ride serves the Route 201 bus to the Rehoboth Beach Boardwalk, the Route 203 bus to Dewey Beach, the Route 204 bus which heads along Savannah Road into Lewes to Cape Henlopen Drive and the Cape May–Lewes Ferry terminal, and the Route 206 bus to Georgetown. The Route 305 "Beach Connection" bus provides service on weekends and holidays in the summer to the Lewes Transit Center Park and Ride from Wilmington, the Christiana Mall, Middletown, Dover, and Frederica, with service continuing south to Rehoboth Beach. The Route 307 bus provides year-round service to Milford, Frederica, and Dover. The Delaware Department of Transportation built the Lewes Transit Center Park and Ride, with groundbreaking taking place on March 9, 2016 and the park and ride opening in May 2017. The Delaware River and Bay Authority operates a shuttle bus route in the summer months that connects the Cape May–Lewes Ferry to the Tanger Outlets and Rehoboth Beach. The city of Lewes operates the Lewes Line bus service serving points of interest in the city daily from May to September.

Lewes was served by a branch of the Delaware Coast Line Railroad that originated in Georgetown, whereupon transfers could be made to trains north to Dover and Wilmington. Passenger trains operated on this branch by its predecessor company, the Pennsylvania Railroad, but ended between 1936 and 1938. The Maryland, Delaware & Virginia Railway operated a passenger train route from Lewes that followed a path to the north of the DCL route. It followed a path through Milton, Ellendale, Greenwood, crossing the state border into Maryland, then continuing further west to Love Point, whereupon travelers would connect with a ferry to Baltimore. This service was replaced by bus service by early 1932.

A rail with trail known as the Georgetown-Lewes Trail opened along the railroad line on October 19, 2016, with future plans to extend the trail to Georgetown. In 2017, it was announced the Delaware Coast Line Railroad would be abandoned between Cool Spring and Lewes after the swing bridge over the Lewes and Rehoboth Canal was closed due to being structurally unsound and repairs were determined to be too costly. The Junction and Breakwater Trail is a rail trail for bicyclists and hikers that connects Lewes and Rehoboth Beach, running  mostly along a former Penn Central Railroad right-of-way.

Utilities

The Lewes Board of Public Works (BPW) provides electricity, water, and sewer service to the city. The BPW was established by an act of the Delaware General Assembly on March 15, 1901. Lewes formerly had a power plant that generated electricity for the city, but the plant's usage was reduced as the city brought in power from outside and the plant was shut down in the 1970s due to rising fuel costs. Lewes currently purchases power from Constellation which is transmitted to the city over Delmarva Power lines. The BPW is a member of the Delaware Municipal Electric Corporation. Trash collection is provided by the city while recycling collection is provided under contract by Republic Services. Natural gas service in Lewes is provided by Chesapeake Utilities.

Health care
Beebe Healthcare Medical Center is located in Lewes, founded in 1916 by the brothers, Drs. James Beebe and Richard C. Beebe. The hospital's name was changed to Beebe Healthcare in 2013 and 2016 marked its 100th anniversary.

Notable people

 Eugene Bookhammer, politician and 18th lieutenant governor of Delaware.
 David Hall, politician and 15th governor of Delaware.
 Dr. Joseph Maull, physician, politician and 34th governor of Delaware.
 Pieter Corneliszoon Plockhoy, early menonite reformer and settler to Lewes in 1663.
 Caleb Rodney, politician and 23rd governor of Delaware.
 Daniel Rodney, politician and 19th governor of Delaware.
 Ebe W. Tunnell, politician and 50th governor of Delaware.
 Otto Wolgast, early settler to the Zwaanendael who helped found Lewes in 1663.

Notable events
On August 21, 2013, a helicopter reportedly dumped $10,000 in multiple dollar bill denominations over Lewes Harbor in the fulfillment of a deceased local resident's last wish.

References

External links
 

The Lewes Historical Society
Lewes, DE Information
City-Data.com Comprehensive Statistical Data and more about Lewes

 
Cities in Sussex County, Delaware
Populated places established in 1631
Cities in Delaware
Former county seats in Delaware
Beaches of Delaware
Salisbury metropolitan area
1631 establishments in the Dutch Empire
Populated coastal places in Delaware